The Winter X Games Europe is an annual sports event – the European edition of the Winter X Games – held in Tignes, France. The first edition was held from March 10–12, 2010. It was the first Winter X Games competition held outside of the United States.  The events are broadcast by ESPN and Canal+. The event consists of slopestyle and superpipe competitions for both skiers and snowboarders on men's and women's sides. Snowmobile riders deliver an exhibition performance.

2010 results

Snowboard

Men's Slopestyle

Women's Slopestyle

Men's Superpipe

Women's Superpipe

Skiing

Men's Slopestyle Final

Women's Slopestyle Final

Men's Superpipe Final

Women's Superpipe Final

2011 results  
The second Winter X Games Europe edition was held in Tignes (France) from the 16th of March to the 18th of March 2011.

Skiing

Men's Slopestyle Final

Women's Slopestyle Final

Men's Superpipe Final

Women's Superpipe Final

2012 results 
The third Winter X Games Europe edition was held in Tignes (France) from the 14th of March to the 16th of March 2012.

Skiing

Men's Slopestyle Final

Women's Slopestyle Final

Men's Superpipe Final

Women's Superpipe Final

References

Winter X Games
Multi-sport events in France
Winter multi-sport events
Recurring sporting events established in 2010
Sport in Savoie